If No-One Sang is the third studio album by English rock band Dave Dee, Dozy, Beaky, Mick & Tich. Allmusic called it "arguably the combo's most musically satisfying and eclectic outing". The arrangements were by John Gregory and Reg Tilsley and it was recorded by Roger Wake. In the US it was titled Time To Take Off.

Track listing

References

1968 albums
Dave Dee, Dozy, Beaky, Mick & Tich albums
Albums produced by Steve Rowland (record producer)
Fontana Records albums